Kazian may refer to:
 Kazian, Azerbaijan
 Kazian, Iran